Elections to Liverpool City Council were held on 1 November 1921.

One third of the council seats were up for election. The term of office for each councillor being three years.

Eight of the 37 seats up for election were uncontested.

After the election, the composition of the council was:

Election result

Ward results

* - Retiring Councillor seeking re-election

Abercromby

Aigburth

Anfield

Breckfield

Brunswick

Castle Street

Childwall

Dingle

Edge Hill

Everton

Exchange

Fairfield

Fazakerley

Garston

Granby

Great George

Kensington

Kirkdale

Low Hill

Much Woolton

Netherfield

North Scotland

Old Swan

Prince's Park

Sandhills

St. Anne's

St. Domingo

St. Peter's

Sefton Park East

Sefton Park West

South Scotland

Vauxhall

Walton

Warbreck

Wavertree

Wavertree West

West Derby

Aldermanic Elections

Aldermanic Election 7 December 1921

Caused by the death of Alderman George Jeremy Lynskey (Irish Nationalist, last elected as an alderman on 9 November 1920) on 27 October 1921, in whose place Councillor Thomas Burke JP (Irish Nationalist, Vauxhall, last elected as a councillor on 1 November 1919
 was elected by the Council as an alderman on 7 December 1921.

Aldermanic Elections 1 February 1922

Caused by the death of Alderman Edward James Chevalier JP
(Conservative, last elected as an alderman on 9 November 1920) on 26 October 1921, in whose place Councillor Robert Lowry Burns (Party?, Princes Park, last elected as a councillor 14 March 1921) was elected by the Council as an alderman on 1 February 1922

Vacancy caused by the death of Alderman Simon Jude (Conservative, last elected as an alderman on 9 November 1913) on 31 December 1921, in whose place Councillor Robert Charles Herman (Conservative, Warbreck,
last elected as a councillor 1 November 1919, Pharmacist of 2 Ullet Road, Liverpool, was elected by the Council as an alderman on 1 February 1922

Aldermanic Election

Caused by the death of Alderman Edward Hatton Cookson (Conservative, last elected as an alderman on 9 November 1913) on 26 March1922

Aldermanic Election

Caused by the death of Alderman Richard Dart (Conservative, last elected as an alderman on 9 November 1913
) on 9 May 1922.

By-elections

No. 4 Vauxhall 5 January 1921

Caused by the election by the Council as an alderman of Councillor Thomas Burke JP
(Irish Nationalist, Vauxhall,
last elected as a councillor on 1 November 1919
 on 7 December 1921
, following the death of Alderman George Jeremy Lynskey
(Irish Nationalist, 
last elected as an alderman on 9 November 1920
) on 27 October 1921
.

No. 13 Princes Park 14 February 1922

Caused by the election as an alderman by the Council of Councillor Robert Lowry Burns (Party?, Princes Park, last elected as a councillor 14 March 1921) on 1 February 1922, following the death of Alderman Edward James Chevalier JP (Conservative, last elected as an alderman on 9 November 1920) on 26 October 1921

No. 26 Warbreck 14 February 1922

Caused by the election as an alderman of Councillor Robert Charles Herman (Conservative, Warbreck,
last elected as a councillor 1 November 1919 on 1 February 1922, following the death of Alderman Simon Jude (Conservative, last elected as an alderman on 9 November 1913) on 31 December 1921.

No. 34 Wavertree 4 April 1922

Caused by the death of Councillor Peter Gill (Conservative, Wavertree, elected 1 November 1919) on 8 February 1922

No. 28 West Derby 4 April 1922

Caused by the death of Councillor William James Bailes
(Conservative, West Derby, elected 1 November 1921) on 22 February 1922

See also

 Liverpool City Council
 Liverpool Town Council elections 1835 - 1879
 Liverpool City Council elections 1880–present
 Mayors and Lord Mayors of Liverpool 1207 to present
 History of local government in England

References

1921
1921 English local elections
1920s in Liverpool